The Capitulary of Quierzy was a capitulary of the emperor Charles II, comprising a series of measures for safeguarding the administration of his realm during his second Italian expedition, as well as directions for his son Louis the Stammerer, who was entrusted with the government during his father's absence. It has traditionally been seen as the basis on which the major vassals of the kingdom of France such as the counts of Flanders, were enabled to become more independent.

It was promulgated on 14 June 877 at Quierzy-sur-Oise in France (département of Aisne), the site of a Carolingian royal palace, before a great concourse of clergy and nobles. Among the participants were Hincmar, Archbishop of Reims, Gauzlin, Bishop of Paris, and Reginar, Duke of Lorraine. In the document, Charles takes elaborate precautions against Louis, whom he apparently deeply distrusted. He forbids him to stay in certain palaces and in particular forests, and compels him to swear not to despoil his stepmother Richilde of her allodial lands and benefices. At the same time, Charles refuses to allow Louis to nominate to the countships left vacant in the emperor's absence. In principle the honores (benefices) and the office of a deceased count must be given to his son, who would be placed provisionally in possession by Louis; the definitive investiture, however, could be conferred only by Charles.

The capitulary thus served as a guarantee to the aristocracy that the general usage would be followed, and also as a means of reassuring the counts who had accompanied the emperor into Italy as to the fate of their benefices. It cannot, however, be regarded as introducing a new principle, and the old opinion that the capitulary of Quierzy was a legislative text establishing the hereditary system of fiefs has been proved to be untenable.

An earlier capitulary of Charles the Bald was promulgated at Quierzy on 14 February 857, and aimed especially at the repression of brigandage.

See also
 Capitularies of Charles the Bald
 Treaty of Coulaines

References 

Full English translation: http://turbulentpriests.group.shef.ac.uk/winning-political-consent-carolingian-style/
Capitulary of Quierzy (Kiersky), Encyclopædia Britannica, 11th Edition, 1911
Nelson, Janet L., Charles the Bald, Longman Publishing, London, 1992, pages 248-250
Bury, J. B. (Editor), The Cambridge Medieval History, Volume III: Germany and the Western Empire, Cambridge University Press, Cambridge, 1922
E. Bourgeois, Le Capitulaire de Kiersy-sur-Oise (Paris, 1885), and L'Assemblée de Quierzy sur-Oise in Études d'histoire du moyen âge, dédiées à Gabriel Monod (Paris, 1896).

Carolingian Empire
877